Iván José Olivares Alvárez (born 10 December 1961 in Caracas) is a Venezuelan former basketball player who competed in the 1992 Summer Olympics. He is considered one of the greatest Venezuelan basketball players of all time.

In addition to the Olympics, he represented his country at the 1990 FIBA World Championship and 1991 South American Basketball Championship.

Olivares played for Springfield College in Massachusetts, earning NCAA Division II All-American honors in 1986. That season, he broke the school record for points in a season with 832. In 1998, he became the first Latino to be inducted into the NCAA Hall of Fame.

After college, he played for the Gaiteros del Zulia, Cocodrilos de Caracas and Trotamundos de Carabobo in Venezuela's Liga Profesional de Baloncesto, winning five league titles with the Trotamundos (1986–89, 1994) as well as the 1988 and 1989 editions of the South American Club Championship. He led the league in scoring in 1994 while teaming with American import Stanley Brundy. He also played in Colombia with Leopardos de Bucaramanga, leading the team in scoring and rebounding in 1988, in addition to stints in Brazil and Argentina.

References

External links
 Springfield Pride bio
 Iván Olivares at RealGM

1961 births
Living people
Venezuelan men's basketball players
1990 FIBA World Championship players
Springfield Pride men's basketball players
Cocodrilos de Caracas players
Trotamundos B.B.C. players
Olympic basketball players of Venezuela
Basketball players at the 1992 Summer Olympics
Venezuelan expatriate basketball people in Argentina
Venezuelan expatriate basketball people in Brazil
Venezuelan expatriate basketball people in Colombia
Venezuelan expatriate basketball people in the United States
Sportspeople from Caracas
20th-century Venezuelan people
21st-century Venezuelan people